The 2007–08 A-League season was the inaugural season for the Wellington Phoenix, who replaced the New Zealand Knights.

Players

First team squad

Transfers

In

Matches

2007 Pre-season Cup fixtures

2007–08 Hyundai A-League fixtures

Exhibition Match

Results by round

League table

Statistics

Appearances

Goal scorers

Goal assists

Discipline

Goal times

Home attendance

Club

Kit

|
|
|
|
|
|
|}

End of Season Awards
See also List of Wellington Phoenix FC End of Season Awards
Sony Player of the Year: Shane Smeltz
Players' Player of the Year: Shane Smeltz
Media Player of the Year: Shane Smeltz
Golden Boot: Shane Smeltz – 9 goals

References

2007-08
2007–08 A-League season by team
Wellington Phoenix season